Pouhala station (also known as Waipahu Transit Center station) is an under construction Honolulu Rail Transit station in Waipahu, Hawaii.

The Hawaiian Station Name Working Group proposed Hawaiian names for the nine rail stations on the Ewa end of the rail system (stations west of and including Aloha Stadium) in November 2017, and HART adopted the proposed names on February 22, 2018. Pouhala means "pandanus post" and refers to a historically important fishpond near Pearl Harbor that is now a wetland habitat.

References

External links
 

Honolulu Rail Transit stations
Railway stations scheduled to open in 2023
Waipahu, Hawaii